Raintree Plantation is an unincorporated community and census-designated place (CDP) in Jefferson County, Missouri, United States. It is in the central part of the county, northwest of Hillsboro. It is built around the Raintree Country Club and several artificial lakes, the largest of which is Rain Tree Lake.

Raintree Plantation was first listed as a CDP prior to the 2020 census.

Demographics

References 

Census-designated places in Jefferson County, Missouri
Census-designated places in Missouri